The Broddenbjerg idol is a wooden ithyphallic figure found in a bog at Broddenbjerg, near Viborg, Denmark and now in the National Museum of Denmark in Copenhagen. It is dated to approximately 535–520 BCE.

The figure was discovered in a bog in spring 1880 by someone cutting peat. It is carbon-dated to approximately 535–520 BCE, the later Bronze Age, making it the oldest such figure in Denmark; prior to testing, it had been dated later, to the Roman Iron Age. One leg is broken off; the other is tapered, so that the figure would presumably have been placed upright in the marshy ground. At the top a face has been carved, with a pointed chin which may indicate a beard; this has been seen as an indication that the figure was created by a Celtic culture. The right eye is much more fully indicated than the left, which is only a line; several other such carved figures also have asymmetrical faces. A line beneath the face may indicate a neck-ring or the top of clothing. Resin had been applied to the groin area and the phallus.

It is one of the best known from Denmark of a group of presumed cult images that have been found mainly in wetlands and peat bogs throughout northern and central Europe. An altar-like arrangement with stones for grinding corn and clay vessels which may have contained food for offerings were found beside it.

See also
Dagenham idol

References

6th-century BC sculptures
1880 archaeological discoveries
Archaeological discoveries in Denmark
Bronze Age art
Germanic anthropomorphic cult images
Germanic archaeological artifacts
Wooden sculptures